Johan Karlsson may refer to:

 Johan Karlsson (footballer, born 1975)
 Johan Karlsson (footballer, born 2001)